Trevilson is a hamlet in the parish of St Newlyn East, Cornwall, England, United Kingdom.

References

Hamlets in Cornwall